Thakor Sonangji Mer or Thakur Sonangji Mair was chief of Kolis. He came from Sindh to Dhandhuka.
His son Dhandhal Khant was founder of Dhandhuka. He conquered the Dhandhuka and founded Dhandhalpur.

See also
 Khant

References

Koli people
Date of birth missing
Date of death missing
People from Sindh
People from Gujarat